Prouds The Jewellers (commonly referred to as Prouds) is an Australian jewellery business founded by William James Proud on Pitt Street, Sydney in 1903.

History

Prouds was founded by William James "Bill" Proud (1871–1931) who had a vision of a jewellery store that sold quality jewellery, watches and giftware that was affordable to all Australians. The company still carries that message to this day. In 1971 LJ Hooker real estate Corporation acquired Prouds' 72 stores and subsequently the business was sold to Goldmark Jewellers. In 1996 Pascoes purchased the then 93-year-old Australian jeweller, saving it from administration.

In February 2008 Prouds lost a case against the Australian Competition & Consumer Commission over 'illusory' 'was/now' price advertising. The Federal Court of Australia found two of Prouds' catalogues, for Valentine's Day and Mother's Day 2006, breached the Trade Practices Act 1974. The decision has been labelled 'important', and Prouds conduct 'misleading and deceptive'

Today

In 1996, Prouds had 67 stores. This increased to over 195 in 2013. 
After the acquisition of Farmers, Prouds jewellery kiosks were included in some Farmers stores across New Zealand as store-within-a-store. However, after the purchase of Angus & Coote, it was replaced with Goldmark, and Prouds is no longer marketed in New Zealand.

As of 2013, Prouds the Jewellers claims to be Australia's 'largest and most trusted jewellery chain' offering 'best value and quality' and 'the largest selection of quality jewellery in Australia'. Prouds reported annual income of NZ$707.6 million in 2008–2009. In 2012 Prouds was reported as being the largest retailer by market share in Australia's estimated AU$3.8 billion jewellery industry. The same report estimated Prouds revenue as AU$600 million. Prouds has become one of the largest and most trusted jewellery store chain in Australia.

References

External links

Jewellery retailers of Australia
Australian companies established in 1903
Retail companies established in 1903
Companies based in Sydney